Land o' Lakes High School is a four-year public high school in Land o' Lakes, Florida.  It is a part of the Pasco County Schools District in Pasco County. The school mascot is the Fighting Gators.

History 
Construction of Land o' Lakes High School began in 1973.  Leroy McClain was named principal and began hiring staff.  Because of critical overcrowding across the county due to a population jump, classes were held in double sessions at nearby Sanders Memorial Elementary School while the school was being built.  When the school finally opened two years later, it served 1,400 students in grades 7 through 12.  Five years later, Pine View Middle School was built to hold grades 6 through 8.

From 2003 to 2007, Land o' Lakes operated on a 10-period bell schedule to ease crowding with most freshmen attending classes from 10:25 AM to 4:45 PM and sophomores, juniors and seniors attending from 7:35 a.m. to 2 p.m.  This was discontinued in 2007, when Sunlake High School opened.

The class of 2008 was the largest in the school's history, with nearly 600 graduates.

Ric Mellin, formerly the principal of J.W. Mitchell High School, became Land o' Lakes' sixth principal in March 2009.  He replaced Monica Ilse, who was appointed principal of the new Anclote High School in Holiday, Florida (opened in August 2009).

In 2012, the school hosted a rally for Republican presidential candidate Mitt Romney, which attracted 15,000 people.

In 1996, Pasco County began implementing the first in a series of Philadelphia Model career academies, which the District called Learning Communities. Land o' Lakes High School started one of these, called the Academy of Business Technology.  ABT started with 9th grade and included teachers Michelle Auger (Science), Elaine Brubaker (Business), Karen Latusek (Business), Mark Pearson (English), Amy Smith (Math), and Mark A. Thompson (Social Studies).  ABT employed integrated curricular instruction and real-life business contexts to teach college-level academics as well as job skills. Amy Smith is still on the faculty of LOLHS. Thompson later became Executive Director of the National Educator Program (NEP), implementing career academies like ABT throughout the United States and the first ever in Afghanistan, China and Uganda.

Recognitions 

In 2005, the school received a grade of A from the state of Florida for the first time. It was also the first time a high school in Pasco County received the ranking. That same year, the school was ranked as number 312 on a list of the top 1,000 high schools in the country in an issue of Newsweek magazine. In 2006 and 2007, the school kept its A grade and remained on Newsweeks annual list of the top high schools.  In 2008, the school again remained on the list. The school also received an A grade for 2009.

In 2012, Land o' Lakes High School renamed its football stadium after coach John Benedetto, who led the Gators to 14 consecutive state playoffs.

In 2022 the Gymnasium was named after Coach Pahulski.

International baccalaureate 
Land o' Lakes is one of two high schools in Pasco County to offer the IB Diploma Programme. High school students in Central and East Pasco attend Land o' Lakes for this program, which draws exclusive demands from teachers and students. IB is also offered at Gulf High School for students in West Pasco.

Graduation rate
In 2012 Land O' Lakes' graduation rate was 91% as compared to a statewide rate of 86.9% and a Hillsborough County rate of 86.2%.

Attendance policy controversy
In 2007 more than 100 juniors and seniors were banned from attending prom due to an attendance policy that states that if students have more than six absences in a quarter, or ten in a semester, they will lose the privilege of participating in extracurricular activities.  This is a district rule enforced by all other schools in Pasco County.  Many students affected by this rule claimed that it had not been enforced before, and they had been allowed to attend homecoming, even with excessive absences.  They tried to start a petition and tried to organize their own prom.

Notable alumni
 Jeff Baisley, baseball player drafted by Oakland Athletics in 2005 out of the University of South Florida
 Stacy Bishop, current professional soccer player for the Atlanta Beat
 Cory Doyne, former MLB player for the Baltimore Orioles
 Jason Garcia, current MLB pitcher for the Baltimore Orioles
 Logan Payne, wide receiver for the Baltimore Ravens
 Derek Thompson, baseball player drafted by the Cleveland Indians in the 1st round of the 2000 Major League Baseball Draft
 Drew Weatherford, class of 2004; named all-American by ESPN in November, 2006; former starting quarterback for Florida State University; former quarterback for Tampa Bay Storm
 Will W. Weatherford, State of Florida House of Representatives

Land o' Lakes High School today 
Nancy Browning, who was hired when the school opened in 1975, retired in 2015.  She has since passed away as of July 2020. Many alumni have returned as teachers.

LOLHS houses approximately 2,265 students in grades 9 through 12.

The school was remodeled during the 2017-18 school year., and renovations were completed in the 2019-2020 school year, with the school administration holding a "Grand Reopening" dedication ceremony.

References

External links
Land o' Lakes High School
District School Board of Pasco County

High schools in Pasco County, Florida
Public high schools in Florida
Land o' Lakes, Florida
Educational institutions established in 1975